James Aloysius Coolahan (April 26, 1903 – July 16, 1986) was a United States district judge of the United States District Court for the District of New Jersey.

Education and career

Born in Hoboken, New Jersey, Coolahan received a Bachelor of Laws from Rutgers Law School in 1925. He was a law clerk from 1925 to 1927, and was in private practice in Jersey City, New Jersey from 1927 to 1949, including service as a first assistant corporation counsel to the City of Hoboken from 1932 to 1943. He was a judge of the Hudson County Court in New Jersey from 1949 to 1956, and of the Superior Court of New Jersey from 1956 to 1962.

Federal judicial service

On February 19, 1962, Coolahan was nominated by President John F. Kennedy to a seat on the United States District Court for the District of New Jersey vacated by Judge Mendon Morrill. Coolahan was confirmed by the United States Senate on April 2, 1962, and received his commission on April 7, 1962. He served as Chief Judge from 1972 to 1973, assumed senior status on June 1, 1974, and serving in that capacity until his death on July 16, 1986, in Spring Lake, New Jersey.

References

Sources
 

1903 births
1986 deaths
Rutgers University alumni
Judges of the United States District Court for the District of New Jersey
United States district court judges appointed by John F. Kennedy
20th-century American judges
20th-century American lawyers